The Way It Feels is Canadian blues singer/musician Roxanne Potvin's second album, released in 2006. The album includes contributions from a wide range of players, including producer Colin Linden, John Hiatt, Bruce Cockburn and members of the Fairfield Four and the Memphis Horns. Eight of the songs on the CD were written by Potvin who also plays electric and acoustic lead guitar.

Track listing
All songs are written by Roxanne Potvin, except where noted. 
 "A Love That's Simple" – 3:35
 "I Want To (Do Everything for You)" (Joe Tex) – 3:11 
 "Hurting Child" – 3:43
 "Caught Up" – 3:22
 "La Merveille" – 2:34
 "While I Wait for You" – 3:36
 "Your Love Keeps Working On Me" (Beverly Bridge, Sonny Thompson) – 3:22
 "Say It" (Lowman Pauling) – 2:38
 "Don't Pay Attention" – 3:18
 "Sweet Thoughts of You" – 3:52
 "Let It Feel the Way It Feels" – 4:35
 "Break Away" (Jackie DeShannon) – 3:51

Personnel

 Roxanne Potvin – Guitar (Acoustic), Vocals, Guitar (Rhythm), Guitar (Electric), Harmony, Soloist, Harmony Vocals, Handclapping, Piano 
 Mark Winchester – Bass, Bass (Upright) 
 Joe Rice – Vocals (Background) 
 Tom McGinley – Sax (Baritone) 
 Bryan Owings – Percussion, Handclapping, Drums 
 Robert Hamlett – Vocals (Background)
 Paul Aucoin – Vibraphone 
 J.D. Fizer – Vocals (Background) 
 Mark W. Winchester – Bass, Bass (Upright) 
 Bob Babbitt – Bass, Bass (Upright) 
 Wayne Jackson – Trombone, Trumpet 
 Daniel Lanois – Vocals, Guest Appearance 
 Colin Linden – Guitar (Acoustic), Guitar (Baritone), Engineer, Guitar (Electric), Dobro, Mandolin 
 Bruce Cockburn – Guitar (Electric), Guest Appearance 
 John Hiatt – Harmony Vocals, Guest Appearance, Harmony

Production
 Colin Linden – Producer
 W. Tom Berry – Executive Producer, Management 
 John Whynot – Producer, Engineer, Mixing 
 Rodney Bowes – Package Design 
 Andrew MacNaughtan – Photography 
 Joao Carvalho – Mastering 
 Jonathan Stinson – Assistant Engineer, Mixing Assistant 
 Jeremy Darby – Assistant Engineer, Mixing Assistant

References

External links
 Roxanne Potvin

Roxanne Potvin albums
2006 albums